The 2014–15 College of Charleston Cougars men's basketball team represented the College of Charleston during the 2014–15 NCAA Division I men's basketball season. The Cougars played their home games at the TD Arena and were in their second year as members of the Colonial Athletic Association.  On August 5, 2014, before the season began, head coach Doug Wojcik had his employment terminated for just cause effective immediately.  This decision was made following numerous accusations that Wojick verbally and physically abused and threatened players.

On September 2, 2014 the university announced that former Clemson assistant coach Earl Grant had been named the head basketball coach for the Cougars.

The Cougars finished the season 9–24, 3–15 in CAA play to finish in last place. They advanced to the quarterfinals of the CAA tournament where they lost to UNC Wilmington.

Previous season 
The Cougars finished the season 14–18, 6–10 in CAA play to finish in a tie for sixth place. They lost in the quarterfinals of the CAA tournament to William & Mary.

Departures

Recruiting

Roster

Schedule

|-
!colspan=9 style="background:#800000; color:#F0E68C;"| Exhibition

|-
!colspan=9 style="background:#800000; color:#F0E68C;"| Non-Conference Regular Season

|-
!colspan=9 style="background:#800000; color:#F0E68C;"| CAA Regular Season

|-
!colspan=9 style="background:#800000; color:#F0E68C;"| CAA tournament

References

College of Charleston Cougars men's basketball seasons
College of Charleston
Charleston
Charleston